CCSC may refer to:
 Camille Chamoun Sports City Stadium, a stadium in Beirut, Lebanon
 Cheung Chuk Shan College, a school in Hong Kong
 Columbus Crew SC, an American soccer team
 Consortium for Computing Sciences in Colleges
 Crawfordsville Community School Corporation, a school district in Indiana, United States

See also
 CSCC (disambiguation)